Carole Brook (born 3 July 1965) is a Swiss former butterfly swimmer. She competed at the 1980 Summer Olympics and the 1984 Summer Olympics.

References

External links
 

1965 births
Living people
Swiss female butterfly swimmers
Olympic swimmers of Switzerland
Swimmers at the 1980 Summer Olympics
Swimmers at the 1984 Summer Olympics
People from Winterthur
Sportspeople from the canton of Zürich